Deborah James Horan (born December 10, 1962) in Quincy, Florida.

Biography 
Horan was a Representative in the House of Representatives of the U.S. state of Florida. She received her Bachelor's degree from the Florida State University. While at FSU she was a member of Kappa Delta sorority. She lives in Key West, Florida with her children.

References

External links
Official Bio for Representative Horan

Florida State University alumni
Democratic Party members of the Florida House of Representatives
1962 births
Living people
People from Quincy, Florida
Women state legislators in Florida
21st-century American women